The Coquille River starts in the Siskiyou National Forest and flows hundreds of miles through the Coquille Valley on its way to the Pacific Ocean. Bandon, Oregon, sits at the mouth of the Coquille River on the Pacific Ocean.  Before the era of railroads and later, automobiles, the steamboats on the Coquille River were the major mode of transportation from Bandon to Coquille and Myrtle Point in southern Coos County, Oregon, United States.

Business and population expansion
Jetty construction at the  two jetties at the Coquille River entrance allowed ocean-going ships to enter the mouth of the river and dock at Bandon.  Economic activity boomed in Bandon in the early 20th century.  A steamship line connected Bandon with Portland and San Francisco.  From 1905 to 1910, the population tripled to 1800.  Bandon had five sawmills and two shipyards.

Rise of navigation by steamboats and other small vessels
As the river ran inland, it became so narrow that it was said that passengers could amuse themselves by leaning out the windows and picking flowers.  William Russell Panter, a descendant of one of the first pioneer families in the area, was apparently one of the first to enter the inland steamboat business.  Wm. R. Panter bought a small steamer, Maria, and put her in service above Coquille, towing a boat hauling milk from farms to the first creamery on the Coquille River, which was about two miles (3 km) up the river from Coquille.  Panter later organized a run to the Timmons cannery in Bandon, towing a scow loaded with salmon caught by fishermen.

By 1899, a boatyard owned by Arthur Ellingson at Prosper, Oregon, began producing steamboats, starting with the small (26 tons) propeller steamer Reta, which operated on the Coquille and later on Coos Bay.  In 1901, the Ellingson yard at Coquille built the sternwheeler Echo (76 tons), she ran for ten years under Captain J.W. McCloskey.  Other boats in the early years of the century on the Coquille River included Liberty, which also served in Coos Bay, and Dispatch.

In 1900, S.H. McAdams, who owned a boatyard in Coquille, built the small (30 tons) sternwheeler Welcome.  Also that year, Ellingson turned out the propeller steamer Favorite and the gasoline propeller Pastime.  In 1901, Ellingson launched Echo and J. Warren, a 10-ton propeller steamer, both for service on the Coquille.  Also in 1901, C.H. James launched the 15-ton propeller steamer Venus at Coquille.  In 1903, the gasoline-powered Nellie & Cressy (12 tons) was built at Bandon.  In 1903, Charles Trigg built Dispatch at Parkersburg, Oregon, for service on the Coquille River.  After 1920, Dispatch was operated out of Marshfield as the John Widdi by the Coquille River Transportation Company.

In 1914, Carl Herman, who owned a boatyard at Prosper, Oregon, built the Telegraph for the Myrtle Point Transportation Company, which competed with the gasoline-powered propeller Charm on the Coquille River.  Telegraph was (by one source) the last steamboat on the Coquille River.  Her owners were able to secure a mail contract for her, but eventually the contract was re-awarded to truck route.

Various small boats were built on the Coquille River over the years, at Prosper, Parkersburg, Coquille, Randolph, and at the Hermann's ranch.  These included Myrtle W. (12 tons), built in 1912 at Randolph, and Antelope, Fawn, Venus, and Maple.  Carl Herman built many boats of various sizes at his yard at Prosper, including in 1909 the Sunset, (12 tons) and in 1909 the Star (12 tons), built for passenger and towing services on the Coquille River.

Passengers and cargoes carried
Very large numbers of people were sometimes transported on the small riverboats.  For one baseball game at Bandon, Dispatch came down from Coquille with about 400 people aboard, and Telegraph arrived with 150.  At one point, Telegraph ran eight different Saturdays along the river to carry people to dances, sometimes at Prosper, sometimes at Parkersburg, Lampa and Riverton.

Coal mines in the area, served by the riverine craft, were at Lampa Creek, Panter's Ranch, Riverton, and Coquille.  Coal was loaded onto ships bound for San Francisco.  Early schools in the area were located at Bandon, Prosper, Randolph, Parkersburg, Lampa Creek, Riverton, Coquille, Arago, Myrtle Point, and Beaver Slough.  The Pearcy Hanly ranch, across from Lampa Creek, shipped milk to Bandon on the river steamers for many years.  There were a number of sawmills, salmon canneries, and other concerns along the river, including a woolen mill and a match factory at Bandon, all of which seem to have been served by the river boats.

Rivalry among steamboat owners
In 1914, Telegraph (96 tons), the largest sternwheeler ever to serve on the Coquille, was built for the Myrtle Point Transportation Co., and launched at Prosper.  She was 103' long, 16.2' on the beam, and with 3.2' depth of hold.  Her engines had 9" cylinders with 42" stroke, developing .  She was built to outcompete the gasoline-powered Charm, which in turn had been placed on the river to beat the old Myrtle, a considerably less powerful boat than Telegraph.  Competition was keen on the Coquille, as a few months after entering service, Telegraph somehow managed to run Charm up on the beach near a narrow spot in the river above Bandon.

Decline and end of riverine transport
The Ellingson yard built Relief in 1916, a 44-ton passenger and freight boat, which turned out to be the last new sternwheeler built on the Coquille River.

In 1924, the gasoline launch Charm was taken off the Coquille River route, and sold to Shaver Transportation Company, who re-equipped her with a  diesel engine and put her in service as a log boom boat.

The Myrtle Point Transportation Company owned the last riverboats on the Coquille.  Stockholders of the company were Russell Panter, Walter Panter, William A. Panter, Paris Ward, and the Huffard brothers.  Paris Ward owned a ranch near Bandon, and as the demand for riverine transport ended, the Panter family's boats were abandoned at the shore of his ranch, where by 1971 what remained of their hulls had filled up with sand.

Links to photos of the steamboat graveyard at the Ward ranch, all taken on June 26, 1941, showing Myrtle, Telegraph, and Dora beached along the Coquille River near Bandon.  Note that while the Salem Public Library Images do not identify these steamers, Marshall does in his book and provides a photograph of the same place, at a slightly different time:  Myrtle was apparently abandoned further inshore than Telegraph.  This may explain why it appears that only two boats are abandoned on shore in photos taken from the water.  Panter also identifies the three abandoned sternwheelers by name.
Abandoned sternwheeler on the Coquille River, probably Telegraph, 1941
Another view of same abandoned sternwheeler on Coquille River, showing a second vessel on the right
Third photo of abandoned sternwheeler and other vessel, from different angle

Image gallery

List of vessels on Coquille River
Codes for this chart:
Vessel type codes are: Prop = propeller-driven; stern = sternwheel-driven; side = side-wheel driven; pddl = paddle-driven, sternwheel or sidewheel.
Disposition codes used in this list are:
 A = Abandoned.
 B = Burned
 NC = Name change
 O = Operational as of date given.
 R = Rebuilt
 T = Transferred (T-Col = Transferred to Columbia River service).
 W = Wrecked by collision or striking ground;
 X = Explosion of boiler.
  Gr = gross tons; Reg = registered tons.
Vessels should not be assumed to have served continuously in the service area shown during the periods shown on this chart; transfer between service areas was common.
{| class="wikitable collapsible sortable"
|+Steamboats on the Coquille River
|- valign=bottom style="font-size:8pt"
!rowspan=2| Name
!rowspan=2| Registry #
!rowspan=2| Type
!rowspan=2| Year Built
!rowspan=2| Where Built
!rowspan=2| Builders
!rowspan=2| Owners
!rowspan=2| Gross Tons
!colspan=2| Length
!rowspan=2| End year
!rowspan=2| Disposition
|-
!ft
!m

|- align=center valign=top style="font-size:8pt"
| align=left|Antelope
| 106440
| prop
| 1886
| Marshfield
| Reed, O.
| 
| 33
| 
|
|

|- align=center valign=top style="font-size:8pt"
| align=left|Ceres
| 125617
| prop
| 1877
| Coquille River
| Reed, Edward
|
| 20
| 
| 1887
| O

|- align=center valign=top style="font-size:8pt"
| align=left|Charm
| 211489
| prop
| 1913
| Prosper
| Herman Bros.
|
| 42
| 
| 1928
| T-Col

|- align=center valign=top style="font-size:8pt"
| align=left|Coos
| 125397
| side
| 1874
| Empire City
| 
|
| 58
| 
| 
|

|- align=center valign=top style="font-size:8pt"
| align=left|Coquille
| 205472
| prop
| 1908
| Coquille
| Lowe, Frank
|
| 63
| 
| 
| T-Col

|- align=center valign=top style="font-size:8pt"
| align=left|Dispatch (1890)
|157278
| stern
| 1890
| Bandon
|
|
| 158
| 
| 1904
| A

|- align=center valign=top style="font-size:8pt"
| align=left|Dispatch (1903)
| 200081
| stern
| 1903
| Parkersburg
| Trigg, Charles
|
| 250
| 
| 1922
| R

|- align=center valign=top style="font-size:8pt"
| align=left|[[Dora (sternwheeler)|Dora']]
| 208076
| stern
| 1910
| Randolph
| Herman Bros.
| Panter, W.R.
| 47
| 
| 1927
| A

|- align=center valign=top style="font-size:8pt"
| align=left|Echo
| 136887
| stern
| 1901
| Coquille
| Ellingson
|
| 76
| 
| 1911
| A

|- align=center valign=top style="font-size:8pt"
| align=left|Elareto|
|
|
|
|
|
|
|
|
|

|- align=center valign=top style="font-size:8pt"
| align=left|FavoriteThe Victor West gallery source says Favorite was built at Bandon.  McCurdy, at 61, gives Coquille.
| 121136
| prop
| 1900
| Coquille
| Ellingson, A.
|
| 63
| 
| 1917
|

|- align=center valign=top style="font-size:8pt"
| align=left|Fawn
| 
| 
| 
| 
| 
| 
| 
| 
| 1909
| O

|- align=center valign=top style="font-size:8pt"
| align=left|J. Warren| 77511
| prop
| 1901
| Coquille
| 
|
| 10
| 
| 
|

|- align=center valign=top style="font-size:8pt"
| align=left|John Wildi
| 20081
| stern
| 1922
| Parkersburg
|
|
| 173
| 
| 1927
| A

|- align=center valign=top style="font-size:8pt"
| align=left|KlihyamKlihyam was a steam tug.
| 205787
| prop
| 1908
| Bandon
|
|
| 125
| 
|
|

|- align=center valign=top style="font-size:8pt"
| align=left|Liberty
| 
| stern
| 1903
| Bandon
| Herman Bros.
|
| 174
| 
| 1918
|

|- align=center valign=top style="font-size:8pt"
| align=left|Limit
| 
| prop
| 
| 
| 
|
| 
|
| 1909
| O

|- align=center valign=top style="font-size:8pt"
| align=left|Little Annie
| 40202
| stern
| 1877
| Coquille
| Rackliff, Wm. E.
|
| 86
|
| 1890
| W

|- align=center valign=top style="font-size:8pt"
| align=left|Maple
| 209300
| prop
| 1911
| Randolph
|
|
| 33
| 
| 
|

|- align=center valign=top style="font-size:8pt"
| align=left|May|
|
|1910
|
|
|
|
|
|
|

|- align=center valign=top style="font-size:8pt"
| align=left|Mary
| 90469
| prop
| 1874
| Coquille River
|
|
| 25
| 
|
|

|- align=center valign=top style="font-size:8pt"
| align=left|Mud Hen
|
| stern
| 1878
| Coquille River
|
|
|
| 
| 1892
|

|- align=center valign=top style="font-size:8pt"
| align=left|Myrtle (1908)
| 205908
| prop
| 1908
| Prosper
|
|
| 78
| 
| 
|

|- align=center valign=top style="font-size:8pt"
| align=left|Myrtle (1909)Myrtle (1909) is reported by the McCurdy Marine History to have been rebuilt as freighter in 1922. Mills, Sternwheelers Up Columbia reports Myrtle was abandoned 1922, this may be a conflict in the sources, or possibly the hull of the 1909 Myrtle was abandoned, with the cabins and machinery being reused.  This was a common practice.
| 206743
| stern
| 1909
| Myrtle Point
| Nelson, Nels
| Myrtle Point Trans. Co.
| 36
| 
| 1922
| R

|- align=center valign=top style="font-size:8pt"
| align=left|Myrtle (1922)
| 222091
| stern
| 1922
| Prosper
|
|
| 36
| 
| 1940
| A

|- align=center valign=top style="font-size:8pt"
| align=left|Myrtle W. (1909)
| 206743
| stern
| 1909
| Myrtle Point
| Nelson, Nels
| Myrtle Point Trans. Co.
| 36
| 
|
|

|- align=center valign=top style="font-size:8pt"
| align=left|Nellie and CressyNellie and Cressy also operated in Coos Bay.
| 
| prop
| 1903
| Bandon
| 
| 
| 12
| 
| 
|

|- align=center valign=top style="font-size:8pt"
| align=left|Norma
|
|
| 1911
|
|
|
|
|
|
|

|- align=center valign=top style="font-size:8pt"
| align=left|Pastime
|
| stern
| 1900
| Coquille
|
|
| 11
| 
| 1901
|

|- align=center valign=top style="font-size:8pt"
| align=left|Port of Bandon|
|
| 1938
|
|
|
|
|
|
|

|- align=center valign=top style="font-size:8pt"
| align=left|Randolph
| 208074
| prop
| 1910
| Randolph
|
|
| 42
| 
|
|

|- align=center valign=top style="font-size:8pt"
| align=left|Rainbow
| 209654
| stern
| 1912
| Marshfield
| Lowe, Frank
| Coos River Trans. Co.
| 75
| 
| 1923
| A

|- align=center valign=top style="font-size:8pt"
| align=left|Relief (1916) 
| 214253
| stern
| 1916
| Coquille
| Ellingson
|
| 44
| 
| 1927
|

|- align=center valign=top style="font-size:8pt"
| align=left|Reta
| 111226
| prop
| 1899
| Prosper
| Ellingson
| 
| 26
| 
| 
|

|- align=center valign=top style="font-size:8pt"
| align=left|Star
| 206127
| prop
| 1909
| Prosper
| Herman, Carl
| 
| 12
| 
| 
|

|- align=center valign=top style="font-size:8pt"
| align=left|Sunset
| 206414
| prop
| 1909
| Prosper
| Herman, Carl
| Fredrick Elmore Drane Line
| 12
| 
| 1929
| A

|- align=center valign=top style="font-size:8pt"
| align=left|Telegraph
| 212094
| stern
| 1914
| Prosper
| Herman, Carl
| Myrtle Point Trans. Co.
| 96
| 
| 1940
| A

|- align=center valign=top style="font-size:8pt"
| align=left|Venus
| 161884
| prop
| 1901
| Coquille
| 
| 
| 15
| 
| 
|

|- align=center valign=top style="font-size:8pt"
| align=left|Welcome
| 81707
| stern
| 1900
| Coquille
| Adams, S.H.
|
| 30
| 
| 1907
| W

|- align=center valign=top style="font-size:8pt"
| align=left|Wilhelmina
| 205444
| prop
| 1908
| North Bend
| 
|
| 95
| 
| 
|

|- align=center valign=top style="font-size:8pt"
| align=left|Wolverine
| 
| prop
| 1908
| 
| 
|O.R Willard, E.D Stuller
| 
| ||
| 1909
| O

|}

See also
Coquille River Light
Steamboats of the Oregon Coast

Notes and sources
Vessel notes:

Source notes

Sources:
 Marshall, Don, Oregon Shipwrecks, Binford and Mort, Portland, OR 1984 
 Mills, Randall V., Sternwheelers up Columbia – A Century of Steamboating in the Oregon Country, University of Nebraska, Lincoln NE 1947 (1977 printing by Bison Press) 
 Newell, Gordon R. ed., H.W. McCurdy Marine History of the Pacific Northwest,  Superior Publishing, Seattle WA (1966)
 Panter, William, "Early River Traffic on the Coquille," Glancing Back (Pioneer Lore), at 16–19, Vol. I, No. 1, Coos-Curry Pioneer and Historical Association (1971)
 Timmen, Fritz, Blow for the Landing – A Hundred Years of Steam Navigation on the Waters of the West, Caxton Press, Caldwell, ID (1973) 
 U.S. Engineer Office, Portland, Oregon, Preliminary Examination of Coquille River, Oregon'', June 14, 1909, United States Congressional serial set, Issue 5732, 61st Cong., 2nd Sess. (1909–1910), p. 60

External links
Coastal Survey chart (no. 18588) showing mouth of Coquille River
Oregon Coastal Atlas: Coquille River Estuary

 
 Coquille River
Transportation in Coos County, Oregon